Ouarzazate Solar Power Station (OSPS), also called Noor Power Station (نور, Arabic for light) is a solar power complex and auxiliary diesel fuel system located in the Drâa-Tafilalet region in Morocco,  from Ouarzazate town, in Ghessat rural council area. At 510 MW, it is the world's largest concentrated solar power (CSP) plant. With an additional 72 MW photovoltaic system the entire project was planned to produce 582 MW. The total project's estimated cost is around $2.5 billion.

The auxiliary diesel fuel system is used to maintain the minimal temperatures of the heat transfer fluid during times when the sun does not shine (including at night), to start the startup and synchronize the turbine to the electrical grid, and other auxiliary functions.

The plant is able to store solar energy in the form of heated molten salt, allowing for production of electricity into the night. 
Phase 1 comes with a full-load molten salt storage capacity of 3 hours. Noor II, commissioned in 2018, and Noor III, commissioned in January 2019, store energy for up to eight hours.

Development 
The project was developed by ACWA Power with the help of the Spanish consortium TSK-Acciona-Sener and is the first in a series of planned developments at the Ouarzazate Solar Complex by the Moroccan Agency for Solar Energy (MASEN). The project received preferential financing from several sources including the Clean Technology Fund, African Development Bank, the World Bank, and the European Investment Bank; the EIB has loaned over 300 million euros to the project.

Location 
The facility lays in Southern Morocco, near the ancient fortified town Ait-Ben-Haddou, near Ouarzazate.

Noor I 

Ouarzazate Solar Power Station (OSPS) – Phase 1, also referred to as Noor I CSP, has an installed capacity of 160 MW. It was connected to the Moroccan power grid on 5 February 2016.
The plant is a parabolic trough type with a molten salt storage for 3 hours of low-light producing capacity.

The cost of the project when it began operations was $3.9 billion. It uses half a million mirrors.

The design uses wet cooling and the need to regularly clean the reflectors means that the water use is high – 1.7 million m3 per year or 4.6 liters per kWh.
Water usage is more than double the water usage of a wet cooled coal power station and 23 times the water use per kWh of a dry cooled coal power station, though life-cycle greenhouse gas emissions of solar thermal plants show that generating comparable energy from coal typically releases around 20 times more carbon dioxide than renewable sources.

The electricity was to be sold at $0.19 /kWh.

The monthly production of electricity of the power plant Noor I in 2017 in MWh was: 
 January: 30261.44
 February: 19418.25
 March: 48605.63
 April: 40376.02
 May: 45445.62
 June: 33369.19
 July: 42276.52
 August: 30850
 September: 41205.18
 October: 31973.98
 November: 22689.4
 December: 27628.56

Noor II 

Noor II CSP is the second phase of the Ouarzazate Solar Power Station. 
It is a 200 MW CSP solar plant using parabolic troughs. 
It has a 7 hours storage capacity.
Construction started in February 2016 and the plant was commissioned in January 2018.

It uses a dry cooling system to decrease water use. The project will supply 1 million people with electricity; it is estimated to save 750,000 tons in  emissions.

Noor III 

Noor III CSP is the third part of the Ouarzazate Solar Power Station. Noor 3 is a different design, the mirrors are mounted horizontally on platforms which are supported by ten metre columns. Each platform is a similar to a tennis court. The panels follow the light, reflecting it to a 250 metre tall solar tower. It is a 150 MW gross CSP solar project using a solar power tower with 7 hours energy storage. 
It uses a dry cooling system to decrease water use.
The CSP tower mirror field was commissioned in March 2018. 
Noor III is the fifth ever built utility-scale CSP tower, but the second with energy storage, after the 125 MW gross Crescent Dunes. At 150 MW Noor III is now the most powerful CSP tower unit built. 
In September 2018 the CSP tower unit was first time synchronized to the power grid. In December Noor III completed a 10-day reliability test demonstrating that the project can provide continuous rated power even in the absence of sunlight.
The solar field has 7400 of such mirrors.

Noor IV 

Noor IV is a 72 MW photovoltaic power station. The total investment in this project is 750 million MAD or about  million USD.

Water use 
Water consumption for the Ouarzazate Noor complex is estimated at 2.5 to 3 million m3 per year for one wet-cooling project (Noor I) and two dry-cooling projects (Noor II and III). The water is sourced from the Mansour Eddahbi dam via pipeline.

Water is needed for cooling, as well as to clean the reflectors regularly with high-pressure water hoses and brushes from trucks.

Fossil fuel use 
Fuel needs for the Ouarzazate complex have been estimated at 19 t/day of gasoil for a capacity of 500 MW.

See also 

 List of solar thermal power stations
 Solar thermal energy

References 

Solar power stations in Morocco
Energy infrastructure completed in 2016
2016 establishments in Morocco
Solar thermal energy
21st-century architecture in Morocco